Manzaneda is a municipality in eastern province of Ourense in the Galicia region of north-west Spain. Its neighbor municipalities include A Pobra de Trives to the north, O Bolo to the east, Vilariño de Conso to the south and Chandrexa de Queixa to the west.
Manzaneda belongs to the comarca (shire) of Terra de Trives.
In 2016 its population was 947.

Manzaneda, in Spain, also is a medium sized ski resort.

References  

Municipalities in the Province of Ourense